The 2012 St Kilda Football Club season was the 116th in the club's history. Coached by Scott Watters and captained by Nick Riewoldt, they competed in the AFL's 2012 Toyota Premiership Season.

Season summary

Pre-season

Regular season

Ladder

References

External links
 
 Listing of St Kilda game results in 2012

St Kilda Football Club seasons